The Harper House is an American adult animated streaming television series created by Brad Neely for Paramount+ and starring Rhea Seehorn, Jason Lee, Ryan Flynn, and Tatiana Maslany. The ten-episode series, premiered on September 16, 2021. A week after the release of the final episode, Neely announced that the show was cancelled after only one season. The series was quietly removed from the service at the end of January 2023.

Premise
The series follows the Harpers and focuses on the matriarch and bread-winner Debbie Harper as she is forced to move her family to the poor side of River Creek, Arkansas. Despite their less than ideal living conditions in an old dilapidated house, Debbie does everything she can to reclaim their lost status.

Cast and crew
 Rhea Seehorn as Debbie Harper, working mother
 Jason Lee as Freddie Harper, stay-at-home father
 Tatiana Maslany as Ollie Harper, 11-year-old daughter and Todd's twin
 Ryan Flynn as Todd Harper, 11-year-old son and Ollie's twin
 Gabourey Sidibe as Shauna Bradley, classmate of Ollie and Ryan
 Gary Anthony Williams as Gbenge Bradley, bookshop co-owner and Shauna's father
 Nyima Funk as Katrina Bradley, bookshop co-owner and Shauna's mother
 VyVy Nguyen as Gwen Dang, JimJoe's mother
 Lance Krall as JimJoe Dang, classmate of Ollie and Ryan
 Roberta Colindrez as Tonya Acosta, Debbie's friend who works as a veterinarian
 Tessa Skara as Brenna, Debbie's obnoxious younger sister
 John "Spud" McConnell as Daddie Dan, Debbie's disapproving but loving father
 Chris Diamantopoulos as Dr.Morocco, school principal
 Joanna Hausmann as Ms.Gonzalez, new teacher
 Kelley Frakes, the mayor of River Creek who despises the ethnic community and lower class
 Johnny Frakes, Kelley's son who is the owner of the gated community and has a obsession with Debbie since high school

Episodes
All episodes were written by Brad Neely.

Production

On January 12, 2020, CBS All Access announced that it had given a series order to The Harper House. The series is executive produced by Brad Neely and Katie Krentz. Brian Sheesley serves as supervising director. On October 20, 2020, CBS announced that Ryan Flynn, Rhea Seehorn, Jason Lee, and Tatiana Maslany would star as the Harper family, with Roberta Colindrez, Chris Diamantopoulos, Nyima Funk, Joanna Hausmann, Lance Krall, John "Spud" McConnell, VyVy Nguye, Gabourey Sidibe, Tessa Skara, and Gary Anthony Williams also voicing characters in the series. The 10-episode first season premiered on September 16, 2021.

References

External links
  

2020s American adult animated television series
2021 American television series debuts
2021 American television series endings
American adult animated comedy television series
American flash adult animated television series
Animated television series about children
Animated television series about dysfunctional families
English-language television shows
Paramount+ original programming
Television shows set in Arkansas
Television series by CBS Studios
Television series by CBS Eye Animation Productions